"Call U Sexy" is the second single released by British band VS and the second to be lifted from their debut studio album, All Kinds of Trouble (2004). The song uses a sample of the song "Body Talk" by Imagination. "Call U Sexy" was released on 7 June 2004 and peaked at number 11 on the UK Singles Chart and number 37 in Ireland. It was also a minor hit in Flanders and Romania.

Track listings
UK CD1
 "Call U Sexy" (radio mix) – 3:22
 "Love You Like Mad" (Kenz slow jam) – 4:07
 
UK CD2
 "Call U Sexy" – 3:32
 "Hold Up" – 4:11
 "Call U Sexy" (Urban North remix) – 5:48
 "Call U Sexy" (video) – 3:32

Charts

References

2004 singles
2004 songs
Innocent Records singles
Song recordings produced by Stargate (record producers)
Songs written by Hallgeir Rustan
Songs written by Mikkel Storleer Eriksen
Songs written by Tor Erik Hermansen
Virgin Records singles